Fairfield is a town in Utah County, Utah, United States. It is part of the Provo–Orem, Utah Metropolitan Statistical Area. The population was 119 at the 2010 census.

History

The town was founded in 1855 when John Carson, his four brothers, and others settled in the Cedar Valley. The settlement was soon known as Frogtown. The population ballooned after the arrival of Johnston's Army in 1858-59, sent to Utah to suppress the rumored rebellion there. The army established a nearby camp called Camp Floyd, and the population grew to over 7,000, including 3,500 troops (nearly one-third of the entire U.S. Army at that time), teamsters, gamblers, and camp followers of various persuasions. With no rebellion taking place, the troops were recalled in 1861 and sent east to fight for the Union with the outbreak of the Civil War.

Frogtown became Fairfield in 1861, named after Amos Fielding, who had participated in establishing the community.

The Stagecoach Inn, located in Fairfield and now a museum, was used by travelers passing through via stagecoach, military personnel, and riders on the Pony Express trail.

Fairfield was incorporated in 2004 due to concerns about growth from surrounding communities. Besides agriculture, the town is a destination for Camp Floyd tourists and home to a large construction landfill.

Demographics

As of the census of 2010, 119 people lived in the town. There were 41 housing units. The racial makeup was 95.8% White, 1.7% from some other race, and 2.5% from two or more races. Hispanic or Latino of any race were 4.2% of the population.

Climate
Fairfield has a continental climate (Köppen Dfb) bordering a semi-arid climate (BSk).

See also
 
 List of cities and towns in Utah
 Utah War

References

External links

 
Towns in Utah
Pony Express stations
Populated places established in 1855
1855 establishments in Utah Territory
Towns in Utah County, Utah
Provo–Orem metropolitan area